The 2011 Trani Cup was a professional tennis tournament played on clay courts. It was the ninth edition of the tournament which was part of the 2011 ATP Challenger Tour. It took place in Trani, Italy between 1 and 7 August 2011.

Singles main draw entrants

Seeds

 1 Rankings are as of July 25, 2011.

Other entrants
The following players received wildcards into the singles main draw:
  Andrea Arnaboldi
  Frederico Gil
  Matteo Trevisan
  Adrian Ungur

The following players received entry as a special exempt into the singles main draw:
  Maxime Authom
  Jonathan Dasnières de Veigy

The following players received entry from the qualifying draw:
  Alberto Brizzi
  Nicolás Pastor
  Pedro Sousa
  Marco Trungelliti

Champions

Singles

 Steve Darcis def.  Leonardo Mayer, 4–6, 6–3, 6–2

Doubles

 Jorge Aguilar /  Andrés Molteni def.  Giulio Di Meo /  Stefano Ianni, 6–4, 6–4

External links
Official Website
ITF Search
ATP official site

Trani Cup
Clay court tennis tournaments
Trani Cup